Omas may refer to:

 Omaswati, Indonesian comedian
 Places in Peru:
 Omas District
 Omas City